The 2005 Big Ten Conference football season was the 110th season for the Big Ten Conference.

Rankings

Bowl games

See also
 2005 All-Big Ten Conference football team

References